Honey for Tea is a British sitcom that aired on BBC1 in 1994. Starring Felicity Kendal, it was written by Michael Aitkens. The series was poorly received at the time, receiving a particularly scathing review from Victor Lewis-Smith in the London Evening Standard. He later described Felicity Kendal's attempt at an American accent as 'Britain's revenge' for Dick Van Dyke's cockney accent in Mary Poppins.

Cast
Felicity Kendal – Nancy Belasco
Nigel Le Vaillant – Prof. Simon Latimer
Leslie Phillips – Sir Dickie Hobhouse
Patrick McCollough – Jake Belasco
Caroline Harker – The Hon. Lucy Courtney
Alan David – Dr. Basil Quinn
Tess Dignan – Jill McSweeney
Crispin Bonham-Carter – Charlie Chadwick
Helena Little – Prof. Debbie Newman
Brenda Bruce – Mary Harris
Bernard Lawrence – Lord St Clair
April Walker – Lady St Clair

Plot
On the death of her husband Harry, a Los Angeles businessman, American Nancy Belasco and her son Jake are insolvent. Much of his money is invested in St Maud's College at Cambridge University, a university he loved. So Nancy, who was born in Cambridge as the child of a GI bride, and Jake decide to go and live in Cambridge. Using her late husband's clout, Nancy gets a job as an assistant bursar, persuading the master of the college, Sir Dickie Hobhouse, to admit Jake on a sports scholarship. This leads to clashes between Nancy and Professor Simon Latimer, who knows Jake doesn't have the academic prowess to warrant his place. Meanwhile, in a culture clash romance, Jake becomes involved with the aristocratic Hon. Lucy Courtney.

Episodes
Episode One (13 March 1994)
Episode Two (20 March 1994)
Episode Three (27 March 1994)
Episode Four (3 April 1994)
Episode Five (17 April 1994)
Episode Six (24 April 1994)
Episode Seven (1 May 1994)

References
Mark Lewisohn, "Radio Times Guide to TV Comedy", BBC Worldwide Ltd, 2003
Honey for Tea at British TV Comedy

External links

1994 British television series debuts
1994 British television series endings
1990s British sitcoms
BBC television sitcoms
Television shows set in Cambridgeshire